Luton Old Boys F.C. is a local Sunday league football club based in Luton, Bedfordshire. They currently play in the Premier Division of the North Home Counties Sunday Football League.

Along with the senior team, they have an U18, U17, U16, U15, U14, U13, U12, U11, U10 and Mixed U9 team.

The club is affiliated to the Bedfordshire County Football Association.

History 
Luton Old Boys played in the South Midlands League from 1991–1994, where they became runners-up in Division One and gained promotion to the Premier League. In the 1993–94 season, they took part in the FA Vase, but lost to Totternhoe 'A' 2–0 in the Extra Preliminary round. At the end of the season, Luton Old Boys left the South Midlands League, but rejoined the South Midlands League in 1996 in Division One. In the 1997–98 season they won promotion to the Premier League, but could not continue their success and were relegated back down to Division One, which was then renamed the Spartan South Midlands League Division Two. The club stayed in the division until the 2001–02 season, when they had to retire from the league. For the 2006–07 season, the club entered the North Home Counties Sunday Football League in Division Two, where they finished the season mid-table. The club stayed in the division until the 2009–10 season, when they gained promotion to Division One. In 2012-13 Luton Old Boys were Division Two Champions

Recent history
2013-14 
Finished 4th in Division One
Top Goalscorer: Paul Ridgeway (21)

2014-15 
Finished 6th in the Premier Division
Top Goalscorer: Paul Ridgeway (9)

2015-16 
Finished 8th in the Premier Division
Top Goalscorer: Tom Denehey (5)

2016-17
Finished 3rd in the Premier Division

Stadium 
The club plays home games at Chaul End Lane aka "The Shed".

Honours
Spartan South Midlands League Division One
Champions 1997–98
Runners-up 1991–92
North Home Counties Sunday Football League Division Two
Runners-up 2009–10
Winners 2012-13

Records
Top Goalscorer
Luke Dolan is the clubs top goal scorer having scored 51 goals in 37 games whilst the club was playing in the North Home Counties Premier Division

References

Football clubs in England
Football clubs in Luton